Fred Wayland Woodcock (May 17, 1868 – August 11, 1943) was a professional baseball pitcher. He attended Cushing Academy in Ashburnham, Massachusetts. He appeared in five games in Major League Baseball for the 1892 Pittsburgh Pirates of the National League. He played college ball at Brown University and Dartmouth College. After his one season in the majors, he played in 1893 in the New England League and in 1895 in the Texas-Southern League.

References

External links

Major League Baseball pitchers
Pittsburgh Pirates players
Brockton Shoemakers players
Fort Worth Panthers players
Brown Bears baseball players
Dartmouth Big Green baseball players
Baseball players from Massachusetts
19th-century baseball players
People from Winchendon, Massachusetts
Sportspeople from Worcester County, Massachusetts
1868 births
1943 deaths